In enzymology, a 2-chloro-4-carboxymethylenebut-2-en-1,4-olide isomerase is an enzyme that catalyzes the chemical reaction

cis-2-chloro-4-carboxymethylenebut-2-en-1,4-olide  trans-2-chloro-4-carboxymethylenebut-2-en-1,4-olide

Hence, this enzyme has one substrate, cis-2-chloro-4-carboxymethylenebut-2-en-1,4-olide, and one product, trans-2-chloro-4-carboxymethylenebut-2-en-1,4-olide.

This enzyme belongs to the family of isomerases, specifically cis-trans isomerases.  The systematic name of this enzyme class is 2-chloro-4-carboxymethylenebut-2-en-1,4-olide cis-trans-isomerase. Other names in common use include 2-chlorocarboxymethylenebutenolide isomerase, and chlorodienelactone isomerase.  This enzyme participates in 1,4-dichlorobenzene degradation.

References

 

EC 5.2.1
Enzymes of unknown structure